The Briggs & Stratton Animal is a single cylinder, four-stroke overhead valve engine used in many go-karting series, such as the IKF, WKA and others. It is based on Briggs & Stratton's 6.5 horsepower generator engines.

History
At the end of the 2004 karting season, many karters were beginning to look for better ways forward in terms of technology. The Raptor engine had reached its engineering maximum, and with the speed required to be competitive constantly rising, they needed a new engine. During the winter break leading into the 2005 season, Briggs & Stratton began to prototype a smaller, faster, and more efficient engine. This would be the Animal.

Over the next year, more Animals were phased into the field. After the Animal's immediate domination in virtually all classes, including Junior Sportsman and 4-Cycle Open Modified, the World Karting Association deemed it too fast to compete against the Raptor.

Current status
In late 2005, the WKA made the shift from Raptors to Animals for most oval track competition classes, due in large part to the engine's durability and efficiency. The Raptor was kept due to its being a better beginner engine for a few novice categories.

Kart racing
Internal combustion piston engines
Animal